Hrvaški Brod is a village on the left bank of the Krka River in the Municipality of Šentjernej in southeastern Slovenia. The area is part of the traditional region of Lower Carniola. It is now included in the Southeast Slovenia Statistical Region. Its name literally means 'Croatian ford'.

References

External links
Hrvaški Brod on Geopedia

Populated places in the Municipality of Šentjernej